Mpal is a town and commune in Saint-Louis Region in north-western Senegal.  It lies on a branch railway of the Senegal Railway system.

See also 

 Railway stations in Senegal

References

External links 

Populated places in Saint-Louis Region
Communes of Senegal